Annemarie Groen (born October 16, 1955 in Naarden, North Holland) is a former backstroke swimmer from the Netherlands, who competed for her native country at the 1972 Summer Olympics in Munich, West Germany. There she was eliminated in the qualifying heats of the 100m Backstroke, clocking 1:09.55 (21st place), and the same happened to her in the prelims of the 200m Backstroke, in 2:29.17 (23rd place).

References
 Dutch Olympic Committee

1955 births
Living people
Dutch female backstroke swimmers
Olympic swimmers of the Netherlands
Swimmers at the 1972 Summer Olympics
People from Naarden
Sportspeople from North Holland
20th-century Dutch women